Dabbas may refer to:

 Athanasius II Dabbas  (died 1619), Melkite Greek Patriarch of Antioch
 Athanasius III Dabbas (1647–1724), Melkite Greek Patriarch of Antioch
 Cyril IV Dabbas, Patriarch claimant who contended with Ignatius III Atiyah
 Mohammad Dabbas (1927–2014), Jordanian politician
 Mohammad Bin Dabbas, paralympic athlete from the United Arab Emirates
 Tiffin carrier, a kind of lunch box

See also 
 Dabba (disambiguation)
 Dabas (disambiguation)